Barlow's disease may refer to 
 Infantile scurvy (named after  Sir Thomas Barlow (1845–1945)), who showed that the infantile scurvy is the same disease as adult scurvy. 
Mitral valve prolapse (named after Dr. John Brereton Barlow (1924-2008)), who first described it in 1966.